Razi Hirmandi (Persian:رضي هيرمندي) (with the real name of Seyed Mohammad Razi Khodadadi (Persian: سيد محمد رضي خدادادي) is an Iranian writer/translator who translates from English into Persian for children and adults.

Hirmandi was born in 1948 in Sistan, Southeast of Iran. He has studied English literature at Mashhad University and later got his M.A.in general linguistics from Tehran University. Hirmandi has written and translated more than 100 books. He has so far won several national awards as well as IBBY Certificate of Honor for his literary translations mainly for children.

Books for children 
If I Didn't Exist (in Persian) Beh Nashr Publisher
There is a Song in Every Heart (in Persian) Beh Nashr Publisher
From Blossom to the Tree(in Persian & English) Kanun e Parvaresh...
A Break with Parvanak (in Persian) Elmi va Farhangi

Research 
A Contrastive Analysis of Tenses in English and Persian (in Persian)

Translations for adults 
1. I Am Joaquin      Rodolpho Gonzales          Amir Kabir

2. Child-to- Child     Arons&  Others                   Madraseh

3. Marching Song     John Whiting                       Farhang e Javid

4. Sokhomlinsy                    ----                          Hastan

5. The Languages of the World       Kenet Katzner  Markaz e Nashr

6. Becoming a Translator              Douglas Robinson       Markaz e Nashr

7. The Death of Ivan Ilych       Leo Tolstoy               Hastan

8. Dictionary of Humorous Quotations          ----     Farhang e Mo'aser

9. The Devil's Dictionary           Ambrose Bierce       Farhang- Mo'aser

10. Shel Silverstein                 Ruth K MacDonald       Hastan

11. Haiku Humor                     Steven Addis             Cheshmeh

12. Call of Love(quotes about love, mother and friendship) --- Ghatreh

13. The Greatest War Stories Never Told   Rick Beyer      Mo'in

14. Sod Calm,Get Angry             ---                Farhang e Javid

15. A Complete and Utter History of the World     Samuel Stewart   Cheshme

16. Haiku Love           ---                       Cheshmeh

17. Sod Calm and  Get Angry: Resigned Advice for Hard Times     Farhang Javid

Translations for children & young adults 
The works of Shel Silverstein for children (10 books)
The best of Dr. Seuss including The Cat in the Hat and 18 other books
The Revolting Rhymes by Roald Dahl
The series of The Big Bear and The Little Bear by Martin Waddell
Eight books from the series of Mr Gum by Andy Stanton
An Absolutely True Diary of a Part Time Indian by Sherman Alexie
The Invention of Hugo Cabret by Brian Selznick
Full list of translations:

1. The Giving Tree    Shel Silverstein        Hastan

2.Lafcadio                             "                           "

3. The Missing Piece            "                           "

4.  The Missing Piece Meets the Big O "         "

5.  A Giraffe and a Half            "                          "

6. Who Needs a Cheap Rhinoceros   "               "

7. Where the Sidewalk Ends     "                           "

8. A Light in the Attic                  "                           "

9. Falling Up                                 "                            "

10.  Everything on It              "                             "

11. Uncle Shelby's ABZ                "                              "

12. The Inch Worm              Leo Lionni                  Kanoon e parvaresh

13. I Won't Apologize          Sofia Prokofieva                      "

14. Penguin and the Pine Cone        Salina Yoon                "

15. Song about Black                 Ann Mc Govern                  "

16. The Tree                               Philis Bosh                Amir Kabir

17. Can't You Sleep , Little Bear    Martin Waddell       Ofogh

18. Good for You , Little Bear                  "                           "

19. Me and You, Little Bear                       "                          "

20 let's Go Home , Little Bear                    "                          "

21 .Sleep Tight , Little Bear                                           "                         "

22. Oh, The Places You Go                    Dr Seuss                    "

23. Did I Ever Tell You  How Lucky You Are.   "                        "

24 . I Had Trouble in Getting to Solla Sollew    "                       "

25. Horton Hatches the Egg                               "                        "

26. Marvin K Mooney ,Will You Please Go Now   "                     "

27 . And to Think That I Saw It On Mulberry Street  "                "

28. I Can Lick 30 Tigers Today and Other Stories    "                "

29. The Cat in the Hat                                                   "                "

30 . The Cat in the Hat Comes Back                            "                "

31. The Sneetches and Other Stories                            "                 "

32. If I Ran the Circus                                                     "                  "

33. The Lorax                                                                  "                   "

34. Daisy -Head Maisy                                                   "                  "

35. I Wish I Had Duck Feet                                             "                   "

36. Horton Hears a Who                                                  "                   "

37. If I Ran the Zoo                                                             "                 Gaam

38. The Butter Battle Book                                                 "                   "

39. Yertle the Turtle                                                              "                   "

40.You Are Old Only Once                                                    "                 "

41. The Absolutely True Diary of a Part-time Indian   Sherman Alexie   Ofogh

42. The Invention of Hugo Cabret                      Brian Selznick           "

43. The Wonderstruck                                            "                                "

44. The Good Citizen Alphabet& the History of the World in Epitom            Bertrand  Russel         "

45. I Didn't Do My Homework Because          David Cali                        "

46. What Use Is a Moose ?                             Martin Waddell                    "

47. The Pencil                                         Allan Ahlberg                 Za'feran

48. The Day The Crayons Quit                   Drew Daywalt          Behnegar

49. On the Wing of Peace                   ---                             Mo'in

50. Changes                                  Anthony                   Qoqnoos

51. The House in the Night        Susan Mary Swanson   "

52.Mr Stink                            David Williams                  Golagha

53. How Do Dinausors Say Good Night?   Jane Yolen   Bafarzandan

54. What Do You Want to Be Brian?          Jeanne Willis     "

55. Five Wishing Stars                  Trisha Runnells                  "

56. Sleep Like Tiger               Mary Logue                                "

57.Tell Me Something Happy before I Go to Sleep Joyce Dunbar                  "

57. Enemy                                David Cali                                 Chekkeh

58. How to Train Our parents     Pete Johnson                     Houpa

59.Bunny Loves to Read             Peter Bently                     Chekkeh

60.Bunny Loves to Write                       "                                      "

61 . Bunny Loves to Learn                      "                                      "

62 . You Are a Bad Man ,Mr Gum      Andy Stanton          Charkh e Falak

63. Mr Gum and the Biscuit Billionaire         "                                   "

64. Mr Gum and the Goblins                          "                                   "

65. Mr Gum and the Power Crystals              "                                    "

66. Mr Gum and the Dancing Bear                  "                                   "

67. Mr Gum in 'the Hound of Lamonic Bibber   "                                  "

68. What's for Dinner, Mr  Gum?                         "                                     "

69. Mr Gum and the Cherry Tree.                       "                                    "

70. Mr Gum and the Secret Hideout                   "                                   "

71. The Story of Mathew Buzzington                        Andy Stanton         "

72.من بدو ، اژدها بدو A Selection of Prelutsky's Poems     Jack Prelutsky  "

73. The Velveteen Rabbit       Margery Williams               Chekkeh

74. If I Were a Book                 Jose Jorge Letria      Elmi Farhangi

75. A Funny Thing Happened on the Way to School Davide Cali                        Ofogh

76. Where the Eagle's Nest Is(translated from Persian)   Taraneh Matloub   Ofogh

77Five Wishing Stars                 Treesha Runnells        Bafarzandan

78.Sleep Like a Tiger                   Mary Logue                            "

79. Tell Me Something Happy before I Go to Sleep Joyce Dunbar                  "

Sources 
Persian Wikipedia

Living people
Iranian translators
Year of birth missing (living people)